Wawayanda Mountain is a ridge in the New York-New Jersey Highlands region of the Appalachian Mountains.  The summit lies within Sussex County, New Jersey.

Geography

Wawayanda Mountain and Pochuck Mountain to the west, form the borders of the Vernon Valley, an important farming and mining area of New Jersey drained by Pochuck Creek.

Appalachian Trail
The Appalachian Trail runs over the top of the ridge within Wawayanda State Park.

Geology
Wawayanda Mountain is part of the Reading Prong of the New England Uplands subprovince of the New England province of the Appalachian Highlands.  The rocks that form Wawayanda Mountain are comprised from the same belt that make up nearby.  This belt, i.e. the Reading Prong, consists of ancient crystalline metamorphic rocks.  The New England province as a whole, along with the Blue Ridge province further south, are often together referred to as the Crystalline Appalachians.  The Crystalline Appalachians extend as far north as the Green Mountains of Vermont and as far south as the Blue Ridge Mountains, although a portion of the belt remains below the Earth's surface through part of Pennsylvania.  The Crystalline Appalachians are distinct from the parallel Sedimentary Appalachians which run from Georgia to New York.  The nearby Kittatinny Mountains are representative of these sedimentary formations.

Wildlife
Mammals inhabiting Wawayanda Mountain include black bear and white-tailed deer.

References

Landforms of Sussex County, New Jersey
Ridges of New Jersey
Mountains on the Appalachian Trail